Bashgul may refer to:

Bashgal Valley, Afghanistan